Cloonacleigha Lough is a freshwater lake in the northwest of Ireland. It is located in south County Sligo and forms part of the course of the Owenmore River.

Geography

Natural history
Fish present in Cloonacleigha Lough include pike. A number of duck species winter in the area of the lake including teal, wigeon, mallard, tufted duck and goldeneye. Wader bird species include lapwing, curlew and Greenland white-fronted goose. Other bird species found in the area of the lake include mute swan and great crested grebe.

Cloonacleigha Lough is part of the Templehouse and Cloonacleigha Loughs Special Area of Conservation as a hard water lake habitat.

See also
List of loughs in Ireland

References

Cloonacleigha